Karlykhanovo (Qarlıxan) is a rural locality (a selo) and the administrative centre of Karlykhanovsky Selsoviet, Belokataysky District, Bashkortostan, Russia. The population was 1,343 as of 2010. There are 22 streets.

Geography 
Karlykhanovo is located 40 km northwest of Novobelokatay (the district's administrative centre) by road. Nogushi is the nearest rural locality.

References 

Rural localities in Belokataysky District